Frank Barron may refer to:
 Frank Barron (baseball) (1890–1964), Major League Baseball pitcher
 Frank Barron (psychologist) (1922–2002), American psychologist and philosopher